Jaka Mgwabi Mwambi was a Tanzanian politician and diplomat. Mwambi is a former Regional Commissioner of Rukwa Region, Tanga Region and Iringa Region and was Deputy Secretary-General of the Chama Cha Mapinduzi party, until he was replaced by George Mkuchika, a Member of Parliament from Newala district, in November 2007.

Mwambi was appointed as the Ambassador of the United Republic of Tanzania to the Russian Federation, and presented his credentials to the Russian Ministry of Foreign Affairs on 24 July 2008, and to President Dmitry Medvedev on 18 September 2008.

References 

University of Dar es Salaam alumni
Chama Cha Mapinduzi politicians
Ambassadors of Tanzania to Russia
Ambassadors of Tanzania to Ukraine
Military of Tanzania
1950 births
2019 deaths